Achaeta is a genus of annelids belonging to the family Enchytraeidae.

The genus was first described by Vejdovský in 1878.

The genus has cosmopolitan distribution.

Species:
 Achaeta eiseni

References

Annelids